Sepia Cinderella is a 1947 American musical race film directed by Arthur H. Leonard. The film is notable for musical numbers by vocalists Billy Daniels and Sheila Guyse, and for a brief guest appearance by former child star Freddie Bartholomew, who is onscreen as himself for five minutes, telling gags to recharge his post-war career.
It was the film debut of Sidney Poitier, who had an uncredited role.

Plot summary 
The musical follows a young woman, Barbara (played by Guyse), in love with a good and kind bandleader, Bob (portrayed by Daniels), who seems oblivious to her love. Barbara helps Bob write a new song, "Cinderella", and it becomes an unexpected hit. Success and sudden fame lead Bob to abandon his former performing venue and lose touch with his friends. He becomes caught in the talons of a devious female club-owner who milks his success and tries to also seduce him, even though she is engaged, unbeknownst to Bob. As his career crumbles and the scales fall from his eyes, Bob's press agent finally finds a way for things to end happily: Bob will make a comeback and in doing so will choose a woman's shoe out of dozens entered, and the winner will sing with him and have her prince. Bob rightly picks Barbara's shoe, and the show goes out on yet another great musical number.

Cast

Soundtrack 
Deek Watson and The Brown Dots - "Long Legged Lizzie" (Words and music by Herman Fairbanks and Deek Watson)
Deek Watson and The Brown Dots - "Is It Right" (Words and music by Deek Watson and William "Pat" Best)
Billy Daniels and Sheila Guyse - "Cinderella" (Words and music by Walter Fuller)
Billy Daniels - "Ring Around My Rosie" (Words and music by Walter Fuller)
Credited in the opening titles, may be used in the background - "Can't Find a Thing to Say" (Words and music by Milt Shaw)
Ruble Blakey - "Oh Ho! It's a Lovely Day" (Words and music by Eric Miller, Ruble Blakey and Rudy Toombs)

DVD release
Sepia Cinderella was released on Region 0 DVD by Alpha Video, as part of a double feature with Dirty Gertie from Harlem U.S.A., on July 31, 2007.

See also
 List of films in the public domain in the United States

References

External links 

1947 films
1947 musical films
American black-and-white films
Race films
American musical films
1940s English-language films
1940s American films